Patricio Echegaray (17 October 1946 – 9 August 2017) was an Argentine politician. He was born in San José de Jáchal, Argentina. He served as General Secretary of the Communist Party of Argentina from 1986 until his death in 2017. Before, Echegaray served as the 26th General Secretary of the Juvenile Communist Federation from 1980 through 1985. He was a member of the Buenos Aires City Legislature from 2000 to 2003.

Echegaray died of pancreatic cancer on 9 August 2017 in Buenos Aires at the age of 70.

References

Other websites
 

1946 births
2017 deaths
Deaths from pancreatic cancer
Communist Party of Argentina politicians
People from San Juan Province, Argentina
Deaths from cancer in Argentina